Christopher Andrew Cashman is an American comedian, voice actor, and Northwest Regional Emmy winner. He is the son of Seattle comic Pat Cashman.

Cashman served as radio co-host on sports station ESPN 710 AM KIRO during Dave Grosby's noon–3 PM show. from the station's inception in 2009 until February 2011

Cashman has appeared several times on the popular podcast Geek Gamer Weekly.
He also hosted a massively multiplayer online game show video game 1 vs. 100.In January 2013, Cashman joined his father and John Keister on a regional comedy show called "The 206", which airs on KING-TV in Seattle. In September 2015, the show was succeeded by Up Late NW.

References

Year of birth missing (living people)
Living people
American male voice actors
Place of birth missing (living people)